La Crau is a commune in the Var department in the Provence-Alpes-Côte d'Azur region in southeastern France.

Population

Twin towns
La Crau is twinned with:

  Villeneuve, Vaud, Switzerland, since 1987
  Rosà, Italy, since 2006
  Schallstadt, since 2018

See also
Communes of the Var department

References

Communes of Var (department)